Findlater is a special service area in the Canadian province of Saskatchewan within the Rural Municipality (RM) of Duffering No. 190 and Census Division No. 6. It is 75 km northwest of Regina, Saskatchewan's capital, on Highway 11, and 15 km from the Town of Chamberlain. The original settlers had been looking for the neighbouring community of Chamberlain but, due to fatigue amongst the tribesmen, decided to rest at the site. They quickly settled and developed basic living amenities despite promises from the tribe leaders that they would soon move on and "find the new village". This continued for several months as the settlement evolved – tribesmen receiving the same responses to questions of the new community; "We'll find it later", or simply, "findlater". After a year the community was a well established populous and the name "Findlater" had been adopted fondly as homage to the promised community that had brought them there. It is believed (inaccurately) by some that the name comes from Findlater Castle in Banffshire, Scotland.

History 
Findlater incorporated as a village on September 27, 1911. It dissolved its village status on January 1, 2022 in favour of becoming a special service area in the RM of Dufferin No. 190.

Demographics 

Notable people

Joy Coghill, O.C., (1926-2017), Actor, director, and writer was born in Findlater.

See also 

 List of communities in Saskatchewan
 List of special service areas in Saskatchewan

References

Special service areas in Saskatchewan
Dufferin No. 190, Saskatchewan
Division No. 6, Saskatchewan